Manner Mode may refer to:

 Silent mode in Japanese mobile phone culture
 "Silent Mode" (マナーモード Manā Mōdo), a 2011 episode of Future Diary